Taboola is a public advertising company headquartered in New York City. The CEO of Taboola is Adam Singolda, who founded the company in 2007. It provides advertisements such as "Around the Web" and "Recommended For You" boxes at the bottom of many online news articles. These sponsored links on publishers' websites send readers to the websites of advertisers and other partners. These online thumbnail grid ads are also known as chumbox ads.

History
Taboola was founded in 2007 by Adam Singolda. The company was founded in Israel and initially provided a recommendation engine for video content. The company headquarters were later moved to New York City.  Taboola raised $1.5 million in funding in November 2007. This was followed by $4.5 million in November 2008, and $9 million in August 2011. Additionally, Taboola raised $15 million in February 2013. By 2019, Taboola was used to provide 450 billion recommendations on a monthly basis, due to adoption by major news websites, like the IBM-owned The Weather Company.

In 2014, Taboola acquired a California-based programmatic advertising company called Perfect Market. In February 2015, Taboola raised $117 million in a Series E funding round. In May of that year, Taboola announced an additional funding from Baidu for an undisclosed amount. In July 2016, Taboola acquired ConvertMedia, a recommendation engine for video content. Terms of the deal were not disclosed. In January 2017, Taboola acquired a website personalization firm called Commerce Sciences, for an undisclosed sum. Commerce Sciences' technology may re-work a website's layout, based on whether a user is more likely to click on a banner ad, newsletter, or video.

In October 2019, Taboola announced its intention to merge with its rival, Outbrain, subject to regulatory approval. If implemented, the deal would have combined the internet’s two largest content-recommendation companies. The aim of this merger was for the two companies to reach a bigger audience in order to be more competitive against the advertising activities of companies like Google and Facebook. Under the terms of the deal, Taboola would have paid Outbrain shareholders 30 percent of the combined company’s stock and $250 million in cash.

The sharp downturn in advertising revenue caused by the coronavirus pandemic in 2020 brought Taboola and Outbrain back to the negotiating table. Both companies stated their ad rates dropped by double digits at the start of the pandemic. The Wall Street Journal reported that the drop in revenue made it harder for Taboola and Outbrain to continue to make their fixed payments to publishers. In September 2020, Taboola and Outbrain could not agree on revised terms and decided to continue as independent organizations. Taboola CEO Adam Singolda said the merger "failed because of the financial contribution of Outbrain" in the previous 12 months. Singolda also said Outbrain “tried to do a deal that was equity only (but less equity), or equity and cash (but less cash) that matched Outbrain’s financial contribution to Taboola." The combined valuation of the called off merger would have been $2 billion.

On 30 June 2021, Taboola began publicly trading on the Nasdaq at a valuation of around $2.6 billion following a merger with special purpose acquisition company ION Acquisition Corp. On 23 July 2021, Taboola announced it was acquiring Connexity, a marketing technology company that operates an retail- and e-commerce-focused advertising network, for $800M from Symphony Technology Group. According to the announcement, the company would become Taboola's e-commerce arm following the completion of the acquisition.

Yahoo partnership
On November 28, 2022, Taboola announced it had signed a 30-year, exclusive commercial agreement with Yahoo!. Under the deal, Taboola will exclusively power native advertising on all of Yahoo’s digital properties globally, such as Yahoo! Finance, Yahoo! Sports, Yahoo! News, AOL and Engadget, with Taboola Ads also available to buy through the Yahoo DSP. Yahoo will receive 24.99% of Taboola’s total issued and outstanding shares as part of the agreement, as well as one representative on the Taboola Board of Directors.

Corporate affairs

Leadership 
Taboola is managed by CEO and Founder Adam Singolda. Other key executives are:

 Eldad Maniv, President, COO
 Stephen Walker, CFO
 Lior Golan, CTO

Products / business model
Taboola creates the "Around The Web" and "Recommended For You" boxes at the bottom of many webpages. Additionally, it can recommend relevant content, including video content. Taboola is used by content publishers to encourage users to view more articles on the same site, or to gain revenues for referral traffic. Marketers and brands bid for views of their content. Then, an algorithm displays the advertiser's content to certain website users based on the content the user is viewing, the content's length and metadata, the user's history, and other factors.  Taboola also has tools for publishers to remove offensive content and vet ads before they are displayed.

Taboola provides approximately 450 billion article recommendations each month. It is implemented on a website with a line of JavaScript. The Taboola Choice feature, which was introduced in 2013, added the ability for users to filter out recommendations they do not want to see. An API for mobile apps was added that December. Taboola started working on extending more features to mobile devices, user-generated content, and apps in 2015. In 2017, the company added a Facebook-like scrollable feed of links to articles and videos.

Reception
According to Fortune, "Popular content isn't always good content." Advertiser-sponsored content displayed through the platform might include articles such as “The World’s Cutest Cat Pictures All On One Site” or “Jeff Bridges’ Magnificent Home Is Beyond Stunning”. In May 2013, Taboola founder Singolda said the ads help support a sustainable business model for journalism and the company vets ads before they are displayed. The company has faced criticism for its promoted content alongside the rest of the native advertising industry, including concerns about the promotion of clickbait articles. According to comments made to the BBC, Taboola CEO Adam Singolda has said that "The problem is that for everyone who hates one piece of content, many others love it, and click on it…if no-one clicked on it, or tweeted about it, then we would remove it."

A report in September 2016 from the nonprofit ChangeAdvertising.org found that 41 of the top 50 news sites — including The Guardian, CNN, Time and Forbes — embed widgets from so-called content-recommendation companies, including Taboola. Several of those that do not, including The New York Times, pay for content created with advertisers in-house to appear in the widgets to increase traffic to their own sites. In 2016 the Taboola widget was installed on a site promoting numerous fake-news stories, and subsequently appeared on a number of articles originating from the site, including one claiming Muslim nurses were refusing to wash their hands before surgery at hospitals in the United Kingdom. Taboola subsequently confirmed that the site operators had displayed its code without permission and that they had since removed their code from the site. A company spokesperson said that “Taboola has a very clear and strict set of guidelines in terms of both fake news as well as trademark infringement”.

In May 2014, the Better Business Bureau's (BBB) National Advertising Division (NAD) requested that Taboola make it clearer that its recommended links are sponsored by advertisers following a complaint by rival company Congoo. The NAD said it recommended the changes, citing the Federal Trade Commission (FTC) due to concerns that Taboola's "sponsored content" disclosures "were not sufficiently clear and conspicuous, or easy to notice read and understand."

In the following years, to tackle the brand safety issue for marketers, Taboola has made a series of investments: it has employed more than 40 people to monitor 30+ languages – committed to reviewing more than 1 million pieces of content on a monthly basis to ensure brand safety – and established partnerships with IAB, Moat, TAG, Integral Ad Science, and Double Verify to address the issue. This ongoing commitment to improving standards across its network led Taboola to be awarded the Gold Standard 2.0 Certification by the IAB UK, in February 2022.

See also
 Native advertising
 Chumbox, type of advert often used by Taboola

References

Contextual advertising
Online advertising methods
Companies based in New York City
Companies listed on the Nasdaq
Digital marketing companies of the United States
Israeli inventions
Israeli companies established in 2007
Marketing companies established in 2007